Penycwm (Welsh for "Head of the valley") is a small settlement on the A487 road near Newgale, Pembrokeshire, Wales. It is part of the community (formerly civil parish) of Brawdy. At the other end of a valley to the coast is Penycwm beach, also known as Pwll March.

The village's Independent Chapel, built in 1870, has now been converted into residential accommodation.

Penycwm was the location for the United Kingdom's first 5-star youth hostel.

References

Villages in Pembrokeshire
Beaches of Pembrokeshire